The Savoy Hotel on Darlinghurst Road in the Kings Cross area of Sydney, Australia burned down on 25 December 1975 with the loss of 15 lives. It was the deadliest hotel fire in Australia at that time.

The fire
On 24 December 1975 the five story Savoy was packed with local workers and holiday makers. At about 5:00 a.m., Reginald John Lyttle, a 25-year-old cook and a petty thief with aspirations of making it into the news, came back from an unhappy night out. He was a guest of the hotel and let himself in through the back door. He found a stack of newspapers inside the hotel, set them on fire near the rear door at about 5:30 a.m., and went up to his room. The fire quickly spread up through the two staircases, trapping 60 people upstairs and blocking off the two fire escapes.

The first call to emergency services was at 5:38 a.m. Guests fled upstairs where they had a choice between jumping multiple floors down or waiting it out in smoke filled rooms. One woman threw her baby from a five meter high window and then jumped out herself, to be caught by firefighters. Many people were trapped inside up to 30 minutes before firefighters could bring in a hydraulic platform to get them out.

At the end of the day, out of the 60 guests in the hotel, 15 died and 25 were seriously injured. Many people were found badly burned in their rooms, some charred beyond recognition.

Perpetrator
Prior to the fire in 1975, Reginald Lyttle had been convicted in other arson cases, including setting a shop on fire in New South Wales and setting a billiard table on fire at a club after he had been let go from a job.

On 25 November 1976, Lyttle was sentenced to four terms of life imprisonment for the murder of four people plus 14 years for maliciously setting fire to the hotel, his sentence was later re-determined with a non-parole period of twenty-eight years. Convicted for 5 more arson cases, Little was at the low-security St Heliers prison farm where he served as a captain of a New South Wales country bush fire brigade. When there were no fires he did fire reduction work, like burn-offs. The fire control officer in charge had heard rumors that he was an arsonist, but did nothing to confirm this. He was ordered back in full-time custody when Corrective Services Commissioner Ron Woodham was informed in 1993.

He was released on parole from Silverwater jail on 12 May 2010, even though he refused to admit to the crime.

Related incident
The Savoy Hotel was owned by alleged crime boss Abe "the boss of the Cross" Saffron. He also owned the building next to it, then housing the Pink Panther strip club with upstairs a brothel called the Kingsdore Motel. In 1989 this building, then the Downunder Hostel, burned down with the loss of six lives. Saffron has been linked to seven other fires.

References

External links
 Resilience NSW 
 

1975 in Australia
Fires in Australia
1975 fires in Oceania
Hotel fires
Arson in Australia
Murder in Sydney
1970s in Sydney
December 1975 events in Australia
Kings Cross, New South Wales